Rainbow Brite is a comic based on the 1980s television show.

A 1985 tie-in comic book to Rainbow Brite and the Star Stealer  was issued by DC Comics.

Reception

Rainbow Brite gained a mostly positive reception from critics.

References

2018 comics debuts
Comics based on television series
Dynamite Entertainment titles
DC Comics titles